Gilmoreteius is an extinct genus of lizard from the Late Cretaceous period in Mongolia.

References

Cretaceous lizards
Late Cretaceous reptiles of Asia